Maggie Cassella is an American-Canadian actress, comedian and writer, best known for hosting the Canadian television talk show Because I Said So and founding the We're Funny That Way! comedy festival.

Biography

Cassella's double degree in philosophy and women's studies led her to a position at a private boarding school in Connecticut teaching philosophy and religion. Finding that a private school teacher's salary inadequate, she attended law school. After almost ten years as a lawyer dealing with cases involving people with AIDS, transitional issues around marriage and bringing a test case for gay adoption to Connecticut, Cassella quit the legal profession and began her comedy career.

Cassella's stand-up comedy style was a mix of rants and raves. She found she could get an unlimited supply of material from just reading the news, Cassella settled in on her Because I Said So format of sit-down comedy tearing through news topics from law, entertainment, technology, religion, and finishing up with the things that she just found irritating. She has performed Because I Said So for 20 summers in Provincetown as well as in other places in North America.

Eventually, Cassella landed a full-time job and the love of her life. One of the original on-air talents on STAR!, she parlayed that job into her own talk show called Because I Said So.

BISS, as it was referred to around the station, allowed Cassella to have some fun and interview celebrities. She continues to do those interviews (even though BISS went bust) as a field producer during the Toronto International Film Festival for the syndicated US entertainment show Extra. Over the years, Cassella has interviewed comedy legends such as Phyllis Diller, Bea Arthur and Joan Rivers, as well as performers such as William H. Macy, Jude Law, Juliette Binoche, Robert Downey Jr., Laura Linney, Eartha Kitt, and k.d. lang.

In 2009, Cassella produced and hosted six episodes of The Vent!, a thirty-minute show she co-created and produced, that focuses on one topic from a variety of angles. Her production company, A Sweet Little Production Company, is located in Toronto and she continues to work on developing shows and films.

She is an out lesbian, and a frequent collaborator of US-based lesbian comedian Lea DeLaria. In addition to performing shows together, the duo have also cowritten a book and two screenplays. Cassella was a co-owner of The Flying Beaver Pubaret, a restaurant and performance venue on Parliament Street in Toronto's Cabbagetown neighbourhood until a fire on February 20, 2015, caused the venue to close for good.

She voices Dr. Mulberry, who is the lesbian character in the 2019 version of Clifford the Big Red Dog.

Filmography

Film

Television

Discography
Because I Said So (2002)

References

External links

American expatriates in Canada
Living people
21st-century Canadian actresses
21st-century Canadian LGBT people
American stand-up comedians
Canadian television talk show hosts
American women comedians
Year of birth missing (living people)
Canadian stand-up comedians
Canadian voice actresses
Canadian women comedians
Lesbian comedians
Canadian lesbian actresses
American queer actresses
American women restaurateurs
American restaurateurs
Canadian restaurateurs
American lesbian actresses
Canadian sketch comedians
Comedians from Toronto
Canadian LGBT comedians
American LGBT comedians